is a Japanese football player. He plays for FC Machida Zelvia.

Career
Hijiri Onaga joined J2 League club V-Varen Nagasaki in 2017. After three seasons, he joined Omiya Ardija.

Club statistics
Updated to 1 January 2020.

References

External links
Profile at V-Varen Nagasaki

1995 births
Living people
Chuo University alumni
Association football people from Hyōgo Prefecture
Japanese footballers
J1 League players
J2 League players
V-Varen Nagasaki players
Omiya Ardija players
FC Machida Zelvia players
Association football midfielders